HDMS Knud Rasmussen is a Royal Danish Navy patrol vessel. Knud Rasmussen and her sister ships normally operate in the waters around Greenland. HDMS Knud Rasmussen is capable of breaking through ice up to 80 cm thick.

Knud Rasmussen participated in Operation Nanook 2010, in August 2010, and 2014, in Baffin Bay and the Davis Strait, with Canadian and American vessels.

References

Bibliographic

Knud Rasmussen-class patrol vessels
Ships built in Denmark
2006 ships
Patrol vessels of Denmark